A pornographer is a person who produces or publishes pornography.

Pornographer may also refer to:

 The Pornographers, a 1966 Japanese film
 The Pornographer, a 2001 Canadian film

See also
 The New Pornographers, a Canadian rock band